Muhammad "Mamadu" Youssuf Candé (born 29 August 1990) is a Guinea-Bissauan professional footballer who plays as a left back.

Club career
On 18 June 2021, he signed with Estrela da Amadora.

International career
He played at 2019 Africa Cup of Nations.

Club statistics

References

External links
 MLSZ 
 
 
 
 

1990 births
Living people
Sportspeople from Cascais
Citizens of Guinea-Bissau through descent
Bissau-Guinean footballers
Guinea-Bissau international footballers
Portuguese footballers
Portuguese sportspeople of Bissau-Guinean descent
Association football defenders
Primeira Liga players
Liga Portugal 2 players
Nemzeti Bajnokság I players
Cypriot First Division players
C.D. Aves players
Fehérvár FC players
Portimonense S.C. players
C.D. Tondela players
AC Omonia players
Radomiak Radom players
C.F. Estrela da Amadora players
Bissau-Guinean expatriate footballers
Expatriate footballers in Hungary
Expatriate footballers in Cyprus
Expatriate footballers in Poland
Bissau-Guinean expatriate sportspeople in Hungary
Bissau-Guinean expatriate sportspeople in Cyprus
Bissau-Guinean expatriate sportspeople in Poland
2017 Africa Cup of Nations players
2019 Africa Cup of Nations players
Sportspeople from Lisbon District